Tecalitlán is a city and municipality in the central Pacific coastal state of Jalisco, Mexico. Located just south of Ciudad Guzmán, its population was 16,705 as of 2020.

Industry
One of Tecalitlán's major industries was the growing of sugar cane. This industry ended about thirty years ago. Nowadays the economy comes from agriculture and the raising of animals such as cattle, pigs, chickens, and goats. Many families of emigrants in the United States receive substantial money from them.

Culture
Tecalitlán is at the heart of the region where mariachi music was developed, and in fact the most famous exponent of that genre, Vargas de Tecalitlán, was founded there in the 1890s (though now resident in Mexico City). There is a museum of this mariachi in Tecalitlan. Tecalitlan has many traditions, such as the fiestas de diciembre which celebrate religion and the love toward the Virgin of Guadalupe. People in this town are very friendly. 

A very interesting tradition kept until now, is that every Sunday after mass, people are used to going to the center of the town (jardin) and spend their afternoon socializing with other people of the town. In this Jardin, girls walk one way and boys on the other way on the sidewalk around the park, so they face each other and check each other out.  Culturally girls do not stare directly at the boys, but would lock arms with each other and chat as they walk. Street vendors sell hollowed out egg shells filled with confetti which is cracked over the heads of someone they admire passing the opposite way. It's quite a special experience and honor as it showed who was admired as they continue to walk and were seen by everyone.  The parents and older folks sit on the benches along the sidewalk and chat and it was a great way to see how the young people interact in a safe environment.   

There is the cerro de la cruz, a mountain were there is a cross that people go to visit and offer sacrifices.

A local culinary specialty is birria, a savory stew made from goat meat and other ingredients. There are also other foods like tacos, sopes, pozole, tostadas, enchiladas and many more Mexican traditional foods.

Comedian/singer Cessy Casanova, whose father and brother have been guitarron players with Vargas de Tecalitlan, was born and raised here.

Gang violence
On December 11, 2010, a gun battle between rival gangs killed 11 people during a Virgin of Guadalupe celebration. Armed men arrived in three cars and opened fire on another group of gunmen in the main plaza of Tecalitlán.

In January 2018, three Italian businessmen were abducted by a group of corrupted police officers linked with a local gang. The Italian men, originating from Naples, are suspected by Mexican prosecutors of having been part of a ring selling fake-brand power generators. The reason for their visit to Mexico is unclear. In relation to the disappearance of the three Italians, one of the leaders of the Jalisco New Generation Cartel, José Guadalupe Rodríguez Castillo known as 'El 15', was captured by the Federal Prosecution Office in July 2018. It remains unclear what happened to the Italians.

On July 2, 2018, the mayor of Tecalitlán, Víctor Díaz Contreras, was shot to death by an unidentified group of vigilantes when traveling in his car in the town part Emiliano Zapata. A municipal employee who was accompanying the mayor was injured. Víctor Díaz Contreras was a member of the then-ruling Institutional Revolutionary Party and one of the youngest mayors in the state.

References

External links
Tecalitlán website
ViveTecalitlan.com

Municipalities of Jalisco